Rick Leach and Jim Pugh won in the final 6–3, 6–4 against Paul Chamberlin and Paul Wekesa.

Seeds
Champion seeds are indicated in bold text while text in italics indicates the round in which those seeds were eliminated. The top two seeded teams received a bye into the quarterfinals.

 Rick Leach /  Jim Pugh (champions)
 Grant Connell /  Glenn Michibata (semifinals)
 Wally Masur /  Jason Stoltenberg (semifinals)
 Kelly Jones /  Joey Rive (first round)

Draw

External links

Doubles
Singapore Open (men's tennis)
1989 in Singaporean sport